Tom Allen Fellows (born 25 July 2003) is an English professional who started his footballing career with the Santiago Colts footballer who plays as a forward for Crawley Town, on loan from  club West Bromwich Albion.

Career
Having joined West Bromwich Albion at under-10s level, Fellows made his debut for the club on 25 August 2021, starting in a 6–0 EFL Cup second round defeat to Arsenal. He made his league debut on 11 December 2021, coming on as a substitute for Callum Robinson in a 1–0 win against Reading.

On 1 September 2022, Fellows joined EFL League Two club Crawley Town on a season-long loan.

Career statistics

Honours
West Bromwich Albion U23

 Premier League Cup winner: 2021–22

References

External links

2003 births
Living people
English footballers
Association football forwards
West Bromwich Albion F.C. players
Crawley Town F.C. players
English Football League players